Ronald Eldredge Neumann (born September 30, 1944) is an American diplomat who served as the United States Ambassador to Afghanistan (2005–2007), Bahrain (2001–2004) and Algeria (1994–1997). He is the son of former ambassador Robert G. Neumann and traveled extensively after college in Afghanistan while his father was ambassador there. Both he and his father served in diplomatic posts in Afghanistan: only one other father-and-son pair, John Adams and his son, John Quincy Adams, did the same; both Adamses served as Ministers to Britain. He pronounces his last name Newmann (without the Germanic neu) and his name is sometimes seen spelled that way.

Career
After college, Neumann served as a U.S. Army infantry officer in the Vietnam War. Neumann joined the United States Department of State as a Foreign Service Officer in 1970. His first posting was in Senegal, but in 1973 he served in Tabriz, Iran, and thereafter specialized in the Middle East, and Persian Gulf in particular.  He also served in the United Arab Emirates. In 1991, while he was Director of the Iran Iraq office (Director of Northern Gulf Affairs), Neumann was involved in overseeing Kurdish refugees in the Middle East.

In 1994 he was made ambassador to Algeria, in part because of his Middle East experience, and served in that capacity until 1997. He subsequently was made Deputy Assistant Secretary of State for Near Eastern Affairs.

In 2000, he was selected to become ambassador to Bahrain, but the Senate did not confirm him immediately and during the delay he was found to be involved in a minor security scandal involving the mishandling of classified materials. He was ultimately cleared of wrongdoing and newly elected President George W. Bush approved his appointment in 2001.

Neumann was ambassador to Bahrain when the embassy there was closed temporarily due to attacks in April 2002 from pro-Palestinian protestors. No one was hurt in the protest although buildings were damaged and vehicles were set on fire.

In 2004, he left Bahrain to serve as a United States political advisor in Iraq and served in that position until he was made ambassador to Afghanistan in 2005. He was sworn in on July 27, 2005 and presented his credentials to Afghan President Hamid Karzai on August 1, 2005. He retained that post until 2007.

Neumann currently serves as the president of the American Academy of Diplomacy, a Washington, DC-based think tank.

In 2009 he authored The Other War: Winning and Losing in Afghanistan, a book exploring political and military issues of Afghanistan.

In 2018 Ronald E. Neumann was presented the Lifetime Contributions to American Diplomacy Award by the American Foreign Service Association.

Neumann is an Advisory Board Member of Spirit of America, a 501(c)(3) organization that supports the safety and success of Americans serving abroad and the local people and partners they seek to help.

Neumann speaks Arabic, French, and some Persian.

References

Sources
"The Other War: Winning and Losing in Afghanistan" Potomac Books
"U.S. works behind scenes to ease tension in Algeria", The Ottawa Citizen, (April 23, 1994)
"Diplomatic Exit Some Way Off, Says Young", Gulf Daily News, (February 27, 2000)
"US Envoy to Stay Till Summer", Gulf Daily News, (September 7, 2000)
"Envoy's Nomination Hits a Security Snag", Gulf Daily News, (September 29, 2000)
"Embassy Row", The Washington Times, (July 24, 2001)
"U.S. Embassy in Bahrain Remains Closed", Gulf Daily News, (April 7, 2002)
"Bahrain: King Reviews US Ties with Outgoing Ambassador", Global News Wire, (June 1, 2004)

External links
Foreign Service Journal article on his Lifetime Contributions to American Diplomacy Award.
BBC News article on his appointment.
Adnki.com article on his appointment.
i-Newswire article.

1944 births
Living people
University of California, Riverside alumni
20th-century American Jews
Ambassadors of the United States to Algeria
Ambassadors of the United States to Bahrain
Ambassadors of the United States to Afghanistan
United States Foreign Service personnel
21st-century American Jews
20th-century American diplomats
21st-century American diplomats